Skullage is a compilation/live album by American heavy metal band Black Label Society, although the first two songs are from Zakk Wylde's solo career and side project Pride & Glory. Some versions also come with a bonus DVD.

This is the third compilation released to document Wylde's catalogue, the first being the promotional-only No More Tears EP, followed by Kings of Damnation 98–04 in 2005.

Track listing

Disc I (CD)
"Machine Gun Man" – 4:57 (Pride & Glory)
"Dead as Yesterday" – 2:51 (Book of Shadows)
"All for You" – 4:00 (Stronger than Death)
"13 Years of Grief" – (Stronger than Death)
"Bleed for Me" – (1919 Eternal)
"Doomsday Jesus" – (The Blessed Hellride)
"Stillborn" – (The Blessed Hellride)
"Won't Find It Here" – (Hangover Music Vol. VI)
"Suicide Messiah" – (Mafia)
"In This River" – (Mafia)
"Fire It Up" – (Mafia)
"New Religion" – (Shot to Hell)
Slightly Amped Instrumental Intro (acoustic) – recorded live on February 13, 2004 in Lehigh Valley
"The Blessed Hellride" (acoustic) – recorded live on February 13, 2004 in Lehigh Valley
"Spoke in the Wheel" (acoustic) – recorded live on February 13, 2004 in Lehigh Valley
"Stillborn" (acoustic) – recorded live on February 13, 2004 in Lehigh Valley

Disc II (DVD)
"All for You"
"13 Years of Grief"
"Bleed for Me"
"Stillborn" (video)
"Suicide Messiah" (video)
"In This River" (video)
"Fire It Up" (video)
"Acoustic" (live)
"Instrumental Intro" (Live in Lehigh Valley)
"The Blessed Hellride" (Live in Lehigh Valley)
"Spoke in the Wheel" (Live in Lehigh Valley)
"We Live No More" (Live in Lehigh Valley)
"Stillborn" (Live in Lehigh Valley)
"New Religion"
"Welcome to the Compound"

Credits (CD side)
Zakk Wylde – vocals, guitar, bass on 3–9, piano
James LoMenzo – bass on tracks 1, 2, 9, 10, 11
John DeServio – bass on track 12
Brian Tichy – drums on track 1
Joe Vitale – drums on track 2
Philth – drums on tracks 3 and 4
Christian Werr – drums on track 5
Craig Nunenmacher – drums on tracks 6–12
Nick Catanese – 12-string acoustic guitar on tracks 13–16

Charts

References

Black Label Society albums
2009 greatest hits albums
2009 live albums
Live video albums
Music video compilation albums
2009 video albums
Eagle Rock Entertainment video albums